Farewell Watts (10 March 1904 – 1970) was an English footballer who played as an inside right for Newport County and Tranmere Rovers. He made 128 appearances for Tranmere, scoring 60 goals.

References

1904 births
1970 deaths
Footballers from Sheffield
Association football inside forwards
English footballers
Newport County A.F.C. players
Tranmere Rovers F.C. players